John Willis Ambrose Ph.D. (1911–1974) was the first President of the Geological Association of Canada in 1947.

Early life
Ambrose grew up in southwestern Alberta.

Education
Ambrose obtained a B.A. from Stanford University in 1932 and a Ph.D. from Yale University in 1935.

Career
Ambrose spent his career exploring geology in Canada. Between 1945 and 1948, he lived in Toronto, but was a Special Lecturer at Queen's University in Kingston, Ontario. In 1948, he moved to Kingston and joined Queen's full-time. He served as head of their geology department from 1962 until 1968. Ambrose retired in 1973.

Legacy
The Geological Association of Canada honours Ambrose annually by awarding the Ambrose Medal to an individual for sustained dedicated service to the Canadian earth science community.

References
A Brief History of Geology at Queen's
Geological Association of Canada Medals and Awards
Raymond Price's Memorial for Ambrose

1911 births
1974 deaths
20th-century Canadian geologists
Academic staff of the Queen's University at Kingston
Stanford University alumni
Yale University alumni